William Bean (1721–1782) was one of the first permanent settlers in Tennessee.

William Bean may also refer to:
William Bean (geologist) (1787–1866), English geologist and conchologist
William Bean (born 1843), Australian businessman and politician, the oldest of Bean Brothers
William Jackson Bean (1863–1947), British botanist
William Hopper Bean, miller of Chillenden Windmill in 1882–1899
William George Bean, British businessman, founded Blackpool Pleasure Beach in 1896
Joe Bean (William Bean, 1874–1961), American baseballer
William Bennett Bean (1909–1989), American medical writer

See also 
Billy Bean (disambiguation)
Willie Bean, a dog
William Beanes (1749–1828), American physician
William MacBean George Colebrooke (1787–1870), English soldier and civil servant in Canada
William McBean (1818–1878), Scottish soldier